The Phoenicis Lacus  quadrangle is one of a series of 30 quadrangle maps of Mars used by the United States Geological Survey (USGS) Astrogeology Research Program. The Phoenicis Lacus quadrangle is also referred to as MC-17 (Mars Chart-17).   Parts of Daedalia Planum, Sinai Planum, and Solis Planum are found in this quadrangle.  Phoenicis Lacus is named after the phoenix which according to myth burns itself up every 500 years and then is reborn.

The Phoenicis Lacus quadrangle covers the area from 90° to 135° west longitude and 0° to 30° south latitude on Mars. The Tharsus rise, which was formed from lava flows, occupies part of area. The volcanoes Pavonis Mons and Arsia Mons are believed to have once had glaciers on them. Glaciers may still exist under a thin layer of rocks.  The ice can be a source of water for the possible future colonization of the planet. One of the most prominent features of this quadrangle is a large intersecting set of canyons called Noctis Labyrinthus. Other interesting features are lava channels, Dark slope streaks, pit crater chains, and large troughs (called fossae). Research published in the journal Icarus has found pits in Zumba Crater are caused by hot ejecta falling on ground containing ice. The pits are formed by heat forming steam that rushes out from groups of pits simultaneously, thereby blowing away from the pit ejecta.

Noctis Labyrinthus
Noctis Labyrinthus is a large canyon system found in the Phoenicis Lacus quadrangle. Its walls contain many layers of rocks. Research, described in December 2009, found a variety of minerals—including clays, sulfates, and hydrated silicas in some of the layers.

Lava channels 
Lava sometimes forms a tube as it moves away from the vent (opening from which lava flows from a volcano). The top of a stream of lava cools down, thereby forming a solid roof. Meanwhile, the lava continues moving in the tube. Often, when all the lava leaves the tube, the roof collapses, making a channel. These features are found on Mars. Some can be seen around Pavonis Mons, in the picture below. Some people have suggested that future colonists on Mars could use lava tunnels as shelters. They would offer great protection from radiation, especially ultraviolet radiation. Lava Channels on the flank of the volcano Pavonis Mons are pictured below in a picture from Mars Odyssey THEMIS. Sometimes the lava tube remains intact for a time. Lava will break out along the tube to accumulate or flow away. Lava flows often have a lobate appearance at the edges. A good view of such a lava tube is shown below.

Glaciers 

Many of the volcanoes on Mars show strong evidence of past and possible present glacial activity.
When glaciers melt and retreat, they leave behind material that was carried in and on the ice. Often the material is dropped in a ridge, called a moraine.  An example of moraines is shown in the picture below from the flank of Arsia Mons, a picture taken with the Mars Odyssey THEMIS.

Dark slope streaks 
A picture below shows dark streaks on the slopes of Aganippe Fossa. Such streaks are common on Mars. They occur on steep slopes of craters, troughs, and valleys. The streaks are dark at first. They get lighter with age. Sometimes they start in a tiny spot, then spread out and go for hundreds of meters. They have been seen to travel around obstacles, like boulders.  It is believed that they are avalanches of bright dust that expose a darker underlying layer. However, several ideas have been advanced to explain them. Some involve water or even the growth of organisms. The streaks appear in areas covered with dust. Much of the Martian surface is covered with dust. Fine dust settles out of the atmosphere covering everything. We know a lot about this dust because the solar panels of the Mars Rovers get covered with dust, thus reducing the electrical energy. The power of the Rovers has been restored many times by the wind, in the form of dust devils, cleaning the panels and boosting the power. So, we know that dust settles from the atmosphere then returns over and over. Dust storms are frequent, especially when the spring season begins in the southern hemisphere. At that time, Mars is 40% closer to the sun. The orbit of Mars is much more elliptical then the Earth's. That is the difference between the farthest point from the sun and the closest point to the sun is very great for Mars, but only a slight amount for the Earth. Also, every few years, the entire planet is engulfed in global dust storms. When NASA's Mariner 9 craft arrived there, nothing could be seen through the dust storm. Other global dust storms have also been observed, since that time.

Research, published in January 2012 in Icarus, found that dark streaks were initiated by airblasts from meteorites traveling at supersonic speeds.     The team of scientists was led by Kaylan Burleigh, an undergraduate at the University of Arizona. After counting some 65,000 dark streaks around the impact site of a group of 5 new craters, patterns emerged. The number of streaks was greatest closer to the impact site. So, the impact somehow probably caused the streaks.   Also, the distribution of the streaks formed a pattern with two wings extending from the impact site. The curved wings resembled scimitars, curved knives. This pattern suggests that an interaction of airblasts from the group of meteorites shook dust loose enough to start dust avalanches that formed the many dark streaks. At first it was thought that the shaking of the ground from the impact caused the dust avalanches, but if that was the case the dark streaks would have been arranged symmetrically around the impacts, rather than being concentrated into curved shapes.

The crater cluster lies near the equator 510 miles) south of Olympus Mons, on a type of terrain called the Medusae Fossae formation. The formation is coated with dust and contains wind-carved ridges called yardangs. These yardangs have steep slopes thickly covered with dust, so when the sonic boom of the airblast arrived from the impacts dust started to move down the slope.
Using photos from Mars Global Surveyor and HiRISE camera on NASA's Mars Reconnaissance Orbiter, scientists have found about 20 new impacts each year on Mars. Because the spacecraft have been imaging Mars almost continuously for a span of 14 years, newer images with suspected recent craters can be compared to older images to determine when the craters were formed. Since the craters were spotted in a HiRISE image from February 2006, but were not present in a Mars Global Surveyor image taken in May 2004, the impact occurred in that time frame.

As the meteorite traveled through the Martian atmosphere it probably broke up; hence a tight group of impact craters resulted.  
Dark slope streaks have been seen for some time, and many ideas have been advanced to explain them. This research may have finally solved this mystery.

Pit crater chains 
Pit craters are common near volcanoes in the Tharsis and Elysium system of volcanoes.  Pit craters form when a void is produced by a cracking of the surface caused by stretching. Also, lava may drain out of an underground chamber, thus leaving an empty space. When material slides into a void, a pit crater or a pit crater chain forms. Pit craters do not have rims or ejecta around them, like impact craters do. On Mars, individual pit craters can join to form chains or even to form troughs that are sometimes scalloped.  Pit craters are not common on Earth. Sinkholes, where the ground falls into a hole (sometimes in the middle of a town) resemble pit craters on Mars. However, on the Earth these holes are caused by limestone being dissolved thereby causing a void.  The image below of Arsia Chasmata contains a pit crater chain.

Fossa on Mars
Certain areas on Mars possess large troughs (long narrow depressions) called fossae in the geographical language used for Mars. This term is derived from Latin; therefore fossa is singular and fossae is plural. Troughs form when the crust is stretched until it breaks. The stretching can be due to the large weight of a nearby volcano. Fossae/pit craters are common near volcanoes in the Tharsis and Elysium system of volcanoes.  A trough often has two breaks with a middle section moving down, leaving steep cliffs along the sides; such a trough is called a graben.  Lake George, in northern New York State, is a lake that sits in a graben.

Volcanoes 
The most common form of volcanism on the Earth is basaltic. Basalts formed from molten rocks that cooled on the surface.  They originated from the partial melting of the upper mantle. They are rich in iron and magnesium (mafic) minerals and commonly dark gray in color. The principal type of volcanism on Mars is probably also basaltic.  Although Mars displays many volcanoes here and other places, there has been no evidence of recent volcanic activity, even at a very low level.  Research, published in 2017, found no active release of volcanic gases during two successive Martian years.  They looked for the outgassing of sulfur-bearing chemicals with spectrometers.

Craters

Other Features in the Phoenicis Lacus quadrangle

Other Mars quadrangles

Interactive Mars map

See also

 Climate of Mars
 Fossa (geology)
 Dark slope streak
 Geology of Mars
 Glaciers on Mars
 Groundwater on Mars
 HiRISE
 HiWish program
 List of quadrangles on Mars
 MOC Public Targeting Program
 Volcanism on Mars 
 Water on Mars

References

External links 

 
Mars